Jiří Vondráček (born 13 March 1993) is a professional Czech football player who currently plays for Kolín.

Club career
Vondráček signed for Slavia in May 2011 after impressing in the fourth division while playing for Náchod. He made his debut in the Czech First League on 14 August 2011 in Slavia's 3–1 win against 1. FK Příbram.

References

External links
 
 Guardian Football
 

1993 births
Living people
Czech footballers
Association football forwards
Czech Republic under-21 international footballers
FK Náchod-Deštné players
SK Slavia Prague players
FC Sellier & Bellot Vlašim players
FK Kolín players
Czech First League players